Anne Maritta Brunila (born 31 August 1957) was the Executive Vice President, Corporate Relations and Sustainability at Fortum Corporation from 2009 to 2013. She has a P.h.D in Economics and Business Administration from Helsinki School of Economics. Brunila has been described as "one of the most influential women in the Finnish economy"

Biography 
In 1983 Brunila's son suffered a brain damaging fever, resulting in him being unable to read or write as an adult. She was tasked with promoting the creative sector of the Finnish economy in 2016 by the Finnish Ministry of Education and Culture. In 2012 she was chosen to select that years Finlandia Award that year.  On October 12, 2012, she decided to resign from her position at Kone  to pursue new careers and activities after her ill father's death. However, she was unable to truly stop working at the company until 2013. Anne was replaced by Helena Aatinen.

Positions

Books

References 

Living people
Finnish businesspeople
Finnish women in business
Academic staff of the Hanken School of Economics
Finnish women academics
1957 births